Hans Maurer (born 13 September 1934) was a West German bobsledder who competed during the early 1960s. He won a bronze medal in the two-man event at the 1962 FIBT World Championships in Garmisch-Partenkirchen.

References
Bobsleigh two-man world championship medalists since 1931

German male bobsledders
1934 births
Bobsledders at the 1964 Winter Olympics
Olympic bobsledders of the United Team of Germany
Living people